Project: Lazarus is a Big Finish Productions audio drama based on the long-running British science fiction television series Doctor Who. It is a sequel to Project: Twilight and a predecessor to Project: Destiny.

Plot
2004. Having discovered the cure to the Forge Virus, the Sixth Doctor and Evelyn travel to Norway seeking Cassie. They find her, but much time has passed and she now works for the Forge and goes by the name of Artemis. At the Forge on Dartmoor, Nimrod conducts a terrible experiment on the Doctor, attempting to force him to regenerate by electrocution. Evelyn talks to Cassie about her son, whom she had forgotten due to Nimrod's brainwashing, and making her realise Nimrod's evil intentions. Cassie tells Evelyn that she knows the secret that she keeps from the Doctor — she has a heart condition and had had an attack just before travelling with the Doctor. She had been afraid to tell him as she thought the Doctor would not allow her to travel with him as his companion. Cassie frees the Doctor, but is killed by Nimrod. Evelyn is distraught, and upset at the Doctor for leaving Cassie behind.

Nearly four years later, the Seventh Doctor detects an anomaly in the vortex, which leads him to the Forge. There he meets his sixth self who is now working as the Forge's scientific advisor and Nimrod is conducting an experiment on the alien Huldran. Other Huldran creatures attack the Forge, and the Sixth Doctor is injured losing his arm. Knowing that he had never lost an arm, the Seventh Doctor makes mind contact and realises that it is in fact only a clone, his DNA taken from him when he endured Nimrod's regeneration experiment. As the Seventh Doctor and the clone Doctor uncover Nimrod's awful experiment, it is revealed that clone is just one of many — Nimrod has lost count of the total. The clone Doctor uses his perfect mimicry of Nimrod's voice and instigates the Hades protocol causing the Forge to shut down, ending all of Nimrod's experiments. The Seventh Doctor apparently escapes with the Forge's human staff and the Huldran, however, Lysanda Aristedes suggests to Ace in Project: Destiny that many of her colleagues were killed on Dartmoor.

The Forge is not totally destroyed however, as the Oracle computer is heard stating that the back up facility has been created.

Cast
The Sixth Doctor/Sixth Doctor's clone — Colin Baker
The Seventh Doctor — Sylvester McCoy
Evelyn Smythe — Maggie Stables
Cassie — Rosie Cavaliero
Nimrod — Stephen Chance
Oracle — Emma Collier
Huldran — Ann Jenkins
Doctor Crumpton — Ingrid Evans
Professor Harket — Vidar Magnussen
Sergeant Frith — Adam Woodroffe
Soldier — Mark Wright

Continuity
 The Sixth Doctor and Evelyn encountered Cassie, The Forge and Nimrod previously in Project: Twilight.
 The Seventh Doctor repeats a line he said in Remembrance of the Daleks: "Ashes to Ashes...Dust to Dust" after the clone dies.
 Cassie's son, Thomas, grows up to become a nurse nicknamed Hex, who travels with Ace and the Seventh Doctor. He discovers that he's Cassie's son during his first encounter with Hex in The Harvest.  He revisits Evelyn to tell her this in Thicker than Water.  Project Lazarus takes place long after Hex left the TARDIS, from the Seventh Doctor's perspective.
 The Seventh Doctor and Hex encounter Nimrod and the Forge in Project: Destiny.  For Nimrod, Destiny takes place last, for the Doctor, Lazarus takes place last.

External links
Big Finish Productions – Project Lazarus

2003 audio plays
Sixth Doctor audio plays
Seventh Doctor audio plays
Doctor Who multi-Doctor stories
Vampires in popular culture
Fiction set in 2004
Fiction set in 2008